52 Persei is a suspected triple star system in the northern constellation of Perseus. It has the Bayer designation f Persei, while 52 Persei is the Flamsteed designation. The system is visible to the naked eye as a faint, yellow-hued point of light with an apparent visual magnitude of 4.68. It is located around 600 light years away from the Sun based on parallax, and is drifting closer with a radial velocity of −4.5 km/s.

The variable velocity of this system was reported by W. W. Campbell in 1918. The components have a visual magnitude difference of 2.7 and are unresolved by speckle interferometry.

The primary component is an evolved bright giant star with a stellar classification of G5II. It has four times the mass of the Sun and has expanded to 32 times the Sun's radius. The star is radiating 531 times the luminosity of the Sun from its enlarged photosphere at an effective temperature of 4,868 K. The secondary is a suspected binary of unknown period, with its components having estimated masses equal to 2.4 and 1.0 times the mass of the Sun. The more massive member of the pair has an estimated spectral class of A2V, matching an A-type main-sequence star.

References

G-type bright giants
A-type main-sequence stars
Spectroscopic binaries
Triple star systems

Perseus (constellation)
Persei, f
Durchmusterung objects
Persei, 52
026674
019811
1306